was a former province in the area that is today the western half of Tottori Prefecture in the San'in region of Japan. Hōki was bordered by Inaba, Mimasaka, Izumo Bitchū, and Bingo Provinces. In terms of the Gokishichidō system, Hōki was one of the provinces of the San'indo circuit. Under the Engishiki classification system, Hōki was ranked as one of the 35 "superior countries" (上国) in terms of importance, and one of the "middle countries" (中国) in terms of distance from the capital. The provincial capital was located in what is now the city of Kurayoshi, Tottori. The ichinomiya of the province is the Shitori Shrine also located in the town of Yurihama. Conversely, Mount Daisen forms a geographic divide, which separates Hōki culturally and historically into eastern  and  regions.

History
From before the Kofun period, the area of Hōki was part of the Izumo cultural area, including the production of iron and the forging of swords. According to the "Hōki Fudoki", the hydra monster Yamata no Orochi pursued Princess Inada into the mountains of Hōki, where she called out for her mother to save her. Her cries of "Hahakimase" became shortened to "hahaki" and eventually "Hōki". The ancient Kojiki states that the burial place of the creator kami, Izanami was located on the border of Izumo with Hōki. During the late Kofun period to Asuka period, Hōki was gradually incorporated into Yamato rule. At the end of the Kamakura period, exiled Emperor Go-Daigo escaped from his prison on the Oki Islands and made Hōki his initial base of operations against the Kamakura shogunate. During the Muromachi period, the Yamana clan were nominally shugo of the province; however, their control over the province was very weak, and local warlords and aggressive neighbors often usurped Yamana authority. In the Sengoku period, the province was a contested area between the Amago clan. Mōri clan and Oda Nobunaga, with Nobunaga's general, Hashiba Hideyoshi eventually seizing control. In the Edo period, the entire province was ruled by a branch of the Ikeda clan as part of the 320,000 koku Tottori Domain centered on Tottori Castle in neighboring Inaba Province, although the important temple and pilgrimage center of Daisen-ji remained independent. 

Following the Meiji restoration and the abolition of the han system in 1871, Hōki became part of Tottori Prefecture on August 29,1871. However, Tottori was merged into Shimane Prefecture on August 21, 1876. It was separated back out on September 12, 1881. However, the name of province continued to exist for some time afterwards for legal purposes.  For example, Hōki is explicitly recognized in treaties in 1894 (a) between Japan and the United States and (b) between Japan and the United Kingdom.

Per the early Meiji period , an official government assessment of the nation’s resources, the province had 778 villages with a total kokudaka of 245,034 koku.

Gallery

Notes

References
 Nussbaum, Louis-Frédéric and Käthe Roth. (2005).  Japan encyclopedia. Cambridge: Harvard University Press. ;  OCLC 58053128

External links 

  Murdoch's map of provinces, 1903

Former provinces of Japan
 Hōki Province
History of Tottori Prefecture
1871 disestablishments in Japan
States and territories disestablished in 1871